The Minister for Digital Development is a cabinet minister within the Government of Sweden and appointed by the Prime Minister of Sweden.

The minister is responsible for issues regarding Information technology, electronic communication, digitalization and internet safety. The Minister for Digital Development is Erik Slottner, appointed on 18 October 2022.

List of Ministers for Digital Development

Status

References

Government ministers of Sweden